

Tonne is a metric unit of mass.

Tonne, Tønne, Tønnes, Tönnes or Tonnes may also refer to:

Places
Tonnes, Norway, a village in Lurøy, Nordland county, Norway
Sainte-Croix-Grand-Tonne, a former commune in northwestern France

Other
Tonne (name), Norwegian name
Tonnes (name), Danish/Norwegian name
Tønne (unit), an obsolete Norwegian unit of volume
Herr Tønne af Alsø, a Danish ballad
Regener-Tonne, a scientific payload for the World War II V-2 rocket
Ten Tonnes (album), self titled debut album

See also
 Ton (disambiguation)
 Tonn (disambiguation)
 Tonny (disambiguation)